Club Esportiu Europa is a Spanish football team based in the city of Barcelona in the district of Gràcia, in the autonomous community of Catalonia. Founded in 1907, it plays in the Segunda División RFEF – Group 3, holding home games at Nou Sardenya, with a capacity of 7,000 seats.

The club is best known for its football team who in 1929, along with city neighbours FC Barcelona and RCD Espanyol, were founder members of La Liga. During the late 1990s they won the Copa Catalunya twice in succession, on both occasions beating FC Barcelona in the final.

The club also has one of the oldest basketball teams in Spain and on 8 December 1922 they hosted Laietà BC in the first ever organised basketball game played in the country. During the 1920s the basketball team were also Catalan champions on two occasions.

History

Club background
CD Europa – (1907–31)
Catalunya FC – (1931–32)
CD Europa – (1932–85)
CE Europa – (1985–)

Origins

CE Europa was founded on 5 June 1907 following a merger between Madrid de Barcelona and Provençal. In 1918/19 season the football team won the B division of the Campionat de Catalunya. After beating CE Jupiter 3–1 and 4–0 in a play-off for the title, they then defeated Athletic Sabadell 7–0 and 9–0 in a promotion play-off.

Golden Age
During the 1920s, after FC Barcelona, CE Europa emerged as the second strongest team in Catalonia. In both 1921 and 1922 they finished as runners-up in the Campionat de Catalunya before winning the title in 1923 under coach Ralph Kirby. After finishing level on points with FC Barcelona, they then beat them 1–0 in a title play-off.

They subsequently represented Catalonia in the 1923 Copa del Rey and after defeating Sevilla FC and Sporting Gijón in earlier rounds. In the Copa del Rey final at the Les Corts stadium, they lost 1–0 to Athletic Bilbao. Kirby subsequently went to coach FC Barcelona during the 1925–26 season.

CE Europa finished as runners-up in the Campionat de Catalunya again in 1924, 1927, 1928 and 1929.

In 1928 their impressive record saw them invited to join the very first La Liga. They spent three seasons in the Primera División: 1928/29, 1929/30 and 1930/31. In 1931, despite the return of Ralph Kirby they were relegated to the Segunda División.

Breakdown

In 1931 CE Europa merged with Gràcia FC, formerly known as FC Espanya de Barcelona, and briefly became known as Catalunya FC. However the merger was not a success and during the 1931/32 season  Catalunya FC, with three games to go, were unable to complete their fixture list due to financial reasons. As a result, the fifteen games they had played in the Segunda División were annulled and the team were relegated to the Tercera División. The club then reverted to the name CD Europa in 1932.

Segunda División
During the late 1950s and 1960s the club enjoyed a brief revival. After twice winning the Moscardó Trophy, a competition for Catalan teams in the Tercera División, they won Tercera División champions in both seasons 1961/62 and 1962/63. On the latter occasion they succeeded in gaining promotion to the Segunda División. After five seasons, they were relegated to Tercera División after season 1967/68.

In 1985–86 season the Castilian Club Deportivo  was replaced with Club Esportiu.

Copa Catalunya
In both 1997 and 1998 CE Europa won the Copa Catalunya, beating FC Barcelona in both finals. In the 1997 final they faced a team coached by Bobby Robson and including Amor and Hristo Stoichkov and won 3–1. In the 1998 final they held the likes of Amor, Sergi, Iván de la Peña, Fernando Couto, Juan Antonio Pizzi and Michael Reiziger to a 1–1 draw at the Mini Estadi. They then clinched the trophy 4–3 on penalties.

Europa won a third cup in 2014–15, after beating Girona FC in the final by 2–1.

Stadium
CE Europa hold home games at Nou Sardenya, with a 7,000-spectators capacity. 1,000 seats are located on a covered tribune, and the pitch's dimensions are 100×63 metres. It opened on 1 December 1940.

Honours

Football
Copa del Rey
Runners-up: 1923

Tercera División
Winners: 1961–62, 1962–63, 2020–21

Championat de Catalunya (T1)
Winners: 1922–23

Championat de Catalunya B (T2)
Winners: 1918–19

Championat de Catalunya Amateur (T3)
Winners: 1917–18, 1933–34

Copa Catalunya
Winners: 1996–97, 1997–98, 2014–15

Basketball
Catalan Championship
Winners: 1924, 1926

Season to season

3 seasons in La Liga
6 seasons in Segunda División
1 season in Segunda División B
1 season in Segunda División RFEF
57 seasons in Tercera División
18 season in Categorías Regionales

Current squad

Coaching staff

Former players
Note: this list includes players that have appeared in at least 100 league games and/or have reached international status.
 Rubén Epitié
 Zoltán Czibor
 Boison Wynney
 Eulogio Martínez
 Manuel Cros
 Marià Gonzalvo
 Antoni Ramallets
 Antonio de la Cruz

Selected former managers
  Ralph Kirby (1920s)
  Josep Maria "Pep" Rovira (1990s)
  Josep Moratalla (1990s)
  Tintín Márquez (1990s)

Club Anthem
Title: Europa, sempre endavant!
Words and Music: Robert Baquero

Europa, Europa, Europa sempre endavant !! 
no tinguem por del que vindrà
el futur hem de guanyar !!

Europa, Europa, Europa sempre endavant !!
que la nostra fe en la victòria
a tothom faci vibrar
Portem amb orgull el blau escapulari
sentim els colors ben endintre del cor

Europa, Europa, Europa sempre endavant !!
que la nostra fe en la victòria
a tothom faci vibrar...
i que la nostra gran història
poc a poc poguem retrobar

Europa, Europa, Europa... endavant, endavant !!

Listen to the "hymn" by clicking here: Club Anthem

References

External links
CE Europa Official Website 

 
Football clubs in Catalonia
Football clubs in Barcelona
Catalan basketball teams
Association football clubs established in 1907
1907 establishments in Catalonia
Segunda División clubs
La Liga clubs